The 1938 South American Basketball Championship was the 6th edition of this tournament.  It was held in Lima, Peru and won by the host, Peru national basketball team.  5 teams competed, including Ecuador in their first appearance.

Final rankings

Results

Each team played the other four teams once, for a total of four games played by each team and 10 overall in the tournament.

External links
FIBA.com archive for SAC1938

1938
S
1938 in Peruvian sport
B
Sports competitions in Lima
Champ
1930s in Lima
February 1938 sports events